Archambault Institution is a prison of the Correctional Service Canada in Sainte-Anne-des-Plaines, Quebec. Its minimum security unit opened in 1968 and its medium security unit opened in 1969; the capacities respectively are 165 and 284.

Notable prisoners
 Léopold Dion, serial killer
 Valery Fabrikant, perpetrator of the Concordia University massacre
 Luka Magnotta
 Jacques Mesrine

References

External links
 Archambault Institution
 Archambault Institution 

Correctional Service of Canada institutions
Prisons in Quebec
Buildings and structures in Laurentides
1968 establishments in Quebec